Accounting History Review is a triannual peer-reviewed academic journal covering the history of accounting published by Routledge. It was formerly known as Accounting, Business and Financial History and was started in 1990. In 2011 the journal was renamed as Accounting History Review. The editor is Cheryl S. McWatters (University of Ottawa).

Abstracting and indexing 
The journal is abstracted and indexed in 

 ABC-Clio/America History and Life; 
 ABI/Inform; 
 Cabell's Directory; 
 EBSCO (Business Source Corporate, Business Source Elite, Business Source Premier); 
 Historical Abstracts;
 IBSS (International Bibliography of the Social Sciences); 
 IBZ (International Bibliography of Periodical Literature); 
 Journal of Economic Literature (Econlit); 
 K.G. Saur Verlag; 
 OCLC ArticleFirst Database and OCLC FirstSearch Electronic Collections Online; 
 Scopus; 
 Swets Information Services;
 Thomson Gale.

See also
Accounting History

References

External links
 

Accounting journals
English-language journals
History of accounting
Publications established in 1990
Routledge academic journals
Triannual journals